Rosita 'Rose' Bradborn (born 1973) is an Philippines international lawn bowler.

Biography
She competed at the 2008 World Outdoor Bowls Championship and 2012 World Outdoor Bowls Championship but came to prominence when winning a bronze medal at the 2016 World Outdoor Bowls Championship in Christchurch in the fours with Hazel Jagonoy, Ronalyn Greenlees and Sonia Bruce.

She won five medals at the Asia Pacific Bowls Championships, of which two have been gold medals. In 2016, she won the Hong Kong International Bowls Classic pairs title with Sonia Bruce.

In 2020 she was selected for the 2020 World Outdoor Bowls Championship in Australia.

In 2023, she won the triples gold medal at the 14th Asian Lawn Bowls Championship in Kuala Lumpur.

References

1973 births
Filipino female lawn bowls players
Living people
Sportspeople from Samar (province)
Southeast Asian Games medalists in lawn bowls
Southeast Asian Games silver medalists for the Philippines
Competitors at the 2005 Southeast Asian Games
Competitors at the 2007 Southeast Asian Games
Competitors at the 2017 Southeast Asian Games
Competitors at the 2019 Southeast Asian Games
Southeast Asian Games bronze medalists for the Philippines
20th-century Filipino women
21st-century Filipino women